Events from the year 1842 in France.

Incumbents
 Monarch – Louis Philippe I

Events
8 May - Versailles train crash at Meudon, results in the deaths of at least 55 passengers.
9 July - Legislative election held.

Births

January to June
31 January - Marie-Charles David de Mayréna, adventurer (died 1890)
13 March - Joseph Valentin Boussinesq, mathematician and physicist (died 1929)
18 March - Stéphane Mallarmé, poet and critic (died 1898)
25 March - Jean Marie Charles Abadie, ophthalmologist (died 1932)
4 April - Édouard Lucas, mathematician (died 1891)
17 April - Maurice Rouvier, statesman (died 1911)
10 June - Jean-Jules-Antoine Lecomte du Nouy, painter and sculptor (died 1923)

July to December
30 July - Auguste Bouché-Leclercq, historian (died 1923)
14 August - Jean Gaston Darboux, mathematician (died 1917)
25 August - Édouard Louis Trouessart, zoologist (died 1927)
28 August - Placide Louis Chapelle, Archbishop in Roman Catholic Archdiocese of New Orleans (died 1905)
30 September - Auguste-René-Marie Dubourg, Archbishop of Rennes and Cardinal (died 1921)
6 October - Gustave Charles Fagniez, historian and economist (died 1927)
8 December - Alphonse Louis Nicolas Borrelly, astronomer (died 1926)

Deaths

January to June
7 January - Charles Berny d'Ouvillé, miniaturist (born 1775)
19 January - Joseph Jérôme, Comte Siméon, jurist and politician (born 1749)
23 March - Stendhal, writer (born 1783)
30 March - Élisabeth-Louise Vigée-Le Brun, painter (born 1755)
8 May - Jules Dumont d'Urville, explorer and French Navy officer, and his wife Adèle, killed in Versailles rail accident (born 1790)
15 May - Emmanuel, comte de Las Cases, atlas-maker, member of Napoleon's entourage and member of the military (born 1766)
24 June - Jean-Baptiste Prosper Jollois, engineer (born 1776)

July to December
13 July - Ferdinand Philippe, Duke of Orléans, Prince Royal of France (born 1810)
19 July - Pierre Joseph Pelletier, chemist (born 1788)
25 July - Dominique Jean Larrey, military surgeon (born 1766)
20 October - Alexandre de Laborde, antiquary, liberal politician and writer (born 1773)

References

1840s in France